AGV, or agv, may refer to:
 AGV (helmet manufacturer), an Italian motorcycle helmet firm
 AGV, the IATA code for Oswaldo Guevara Mujica Airport in Portuguesa state, Venezuela
 agv, the ISO 639-3 code for the Remontado Agta language spoken in parts of the Philippines
 AGV, the National Rail code for Abergavenny railway station, Wales, UK 
 AGV (train), a high-speed multiple-unit train built by Alstom
 Attorney-General of Victoria
 Attorney General of Virginia
 Australian grapevine viroid, a plant viroid
 Automated Guided Vehicle, a mobile robot used in industrial applications to move materials around

See also